Lisa Raymond and Mike Bryan were the defending champions, but lost in the quarterfinals to Cara Black and Wayne Black.

Katarina Srebotnik and Bob Bryan won the title, defeating Lina Krasnoroutskaya and Daniel Nestor in the final 5–7, 7–5, [10–5].

Seeds

Draw

Finals

Top half

Bottom half

External links
 Official Results Archive (WTA)
2003 US Open – Doubles draws and results at the International Tennis Federation

Mixed Doubles
US Open (tennis) by year – Mixed doubles